Aari or AARI may refer to:

 Aari (actor) (born 1985), Indian Tamil film actor
 Aari language, an Omotic language
Aari people, an ethnic group from Ethiopia
 Aari work, a type of embroidery from India / Pakistan
 Arctic and Antarctic Research Institute